The Lebanon County, Pennsylvania Women’s Hall of Fame was established by the county's Commission for Women in 2010 to "...preserve women’s history, and honor the outstanding achievements of unsung heroes in our community."
The following list details those individual inductions. 
As of the 2020 US Census count, Lebanon County, Pennsylvania has a population of 143,257, of which 50.8% are women. The county labor force is composed of  58.3% women.

2022

Presentation ceremony March 25, 2022

Guadalupe Barba
Founder, along with her husband, of Junto de Lebanon, an informational liaison service for the Spanish-speaking community

Frances Campbell
Volunteerism and community support advocate

Tammy Cassell
Executive Director of P.R.O.B.E.

Vicki Deloatch
CFO Lebanon Family Health Services

Miriam Enck
Co-founder of East Indies Coffee and Tea Company

Mildred Hernandez
American Red Cross volunteer 

Francy Reigert
Teacher, Lebanon School District

Joy Riley
Tennis pro

Kerrie Smedley
Owner, Annville Psychological Services

Melanie Wells, M.A.
Wellspan Good Samaritan Hospital, community programs

Andrea Whelan
Pennsylvania Army National Guard

2020

Stephanie Andreozzi
Senior Director, Clinical Services, at WellSpan Good Samaritan Hospital.

Cheryl Batdorf
Financial advisor.

Laurie Bowersox
Executive Director of the Lebanon Campus of the Harrisburg Area Community College.

Janice Buckingham
Creator of the local Alzheimer’s Association/Dementia Support Group of Eastern Lebanon County.

Judith Jo Clark
Licensed Professional Counselor and Certified Alcohol & Drug Counselor.

Christina Davis (education)
Instructor and supervisor with Lancaster-Lebanon IU13 for 35 years.

Jennifer DyReyes
Director of Global Systems and Robotic Process Automation at ADP, a Fortune 250 company.

Norma Iris Gonzalez
Trailblazer, Director of Therapy at the Sexual Assault Resources and Counseling Center.

Jenny Murphy-Shifflet
Trailblazer, retired President/CEO of the Sexual Assault Resource and Counseling Center of Lebanon and Schuylkill Counties.

Joanna Guldin-Noll
Social Media Manager for Military.com, and also is the co-owner of Swatara Coffee Company.

Meghan Winslow
Art teacher and mentor. Founder of SPLAT art studio.

2019

Jennifer Bower
Community Service. Supervisor and co-owner of Domino's Pizza franchises in Lebanon and Myerstown.

Gloria Ebling
President of the Myerstown Planning Commission.

Cindy Heisey
Trailblazer, Lebanon County Commission for Women and multiple other projects.

Renee Krizan
Associate Artistic Director at Gretna Theatre.

Gretchen Oberst
Educator, Agricultural Education at Northern Lebanon High School.

Susan Szydlowski
Board member of Lebanon Family Health Services.

Erin Ulrich
Clinical Education Coordinator for the Athletic Training Program at Lebanon Valley College.

Cindy Van Aken
Family Engagement Coordinator at the Lebanon School District.

Pamela Weiss
First woman lawyer in Lebanon County to practice family law.

Jan Wessell
Founding member of Support Connections of Lebanon County, Inc. 

Margaret Wilson (Registered nurse)
Retired Captain, United States Navy,  Associate Director for Patient Care Services VA Lebanon health care.

2018

Linda Bell (The Arts)
Mount Gretna Art Show and Gretna Theater.

Josephine Ames
Business woman.

Patricia Bachman (1959–2016)
Principal of Pine Street Elementary School.

Tracie Clemens
Trailblazer, Director of Elementary Education and Federal Programs with the Cornwall Lebanon School District.

Jessica Dreibelbis
Lebanon County Special Olympics.

Debra Gingrich
Volunteerism.

Marsha Novick
Director of the Pediatric Multidisciplinary Weight Loss Program at the Penn State Hershey Children’s Hospital.

Shila Ulrich
Director of The Caring Cupboard.

Kimberly Kreider Umble
Trailblazer, President and CEO of Lebanon Family Health Services.

Gwendolyn Ward
Girl Scouts in Lebanon County, founding board member of Female Offenders Re-Entry Program.

2017

Susan Allwein (c1944 -2020)
Co-founder of Allwein’s Flooring Center and Allwein’s Cleaning Services.
Nori Fisher
Trailblazer, community volunteer.
Mary Gardner
Swimming coach.
Marianne Goodfellow
Professor at Penn State University, Lebanon Valley College Department of Sociology and Criminal Justice.
Maryann Guldin
Northern Lebanon High School teacher, created Child Development Playgroup. Pennsylvania Association of Family and Consumer Sciences Teacher of the Year in 2014, and in 2015 was an American Association of Family and Consumer Science National Teacher of the Year Merit Finalist.
Beryl Hoffman
Membership and leadership in several Arts organizations.
Jennie Horstick (1923 -2020)  
Trailblazer, founded Palmyra Garden Club.
Linda Krall
President of Farm Women’s group, county President of the Lebanon County Farm Women.
Lillian Morales
Participation in Lebanon County Community Action Partnership and many civic groups.
Amy Schaffer-Duong
Science and Technology.
Phyllis Weiant and Amanda Musser
Mother ad daughter promoting healthy lifestyles to combat cancer.
Priscilla Wolf
Board of Directors for Halcyon Activity Center. Flautist and board member in the Lebanon Community Concert Band; flautist in the Ephrata Community Band.

2016
Ashley Durniak
Co-creator of Sonrise Academy.
Karen Groh
Board member of YMCA Camp Shand, Community of Lebanon Association (CLA), Lancaster, and Lebanon Valley Chamber of Commerce (LVCC).
Courtney Hershey
Co-creator of Sonrise Academy.
Mary Burchik Huber
Trailblazer, Attorney
Julie Sykes Kaylor
Created the Lebanon County Gleaning Network, which coordinates with local growers to distribute excess fruit and vegetable harvests to needy individuals and families.
Karla Ludwig
Medical Director of the Oncology Program at the WellSpan Good Samaritan Hospital.
Rebecca Reed (teacher)
Software developer.
Michelle Remlinger
Promoting healthy lifestyles,
Emi Snavely
Board of Directors of Gretna Music.
Hazel Swisher (1940–2021)
Lebanon County Deputy Sheriff, two terms as District Justice, Outstanding Business Woman of Lebanon County for 1991–1992.
Kristen Watts
Banking industry.

2015

Marianne Bartley
Retired superintendent Lebanon School District.
Jennifer Davis
Owner of Dental Art Images.
Jennifer Gettle
Chief Deputy District Attorney for Dauphin County.
Rebecca Gacono Harlan
Trailblazer, Co-owner of Prudential Gacono Real Estate, Annville Community Activities Committee, Lebanon Daily News “Citizen of the Year” in 2008.
Patti Hower
Head coach of the Lebanon Catholic Girls Basketball team. 2011 inductee of the Pennsylvania Sports State Hall of Fame, 2013 inductee of the Central Chapter of the Pennsylvania Sports Hall of Fame. 1995 Coach of the Year by the Pennsylvania Scholastic Girls Coaching Association.
Shirley Krall
Dairy farmer,  Pennsylvania Agriculture Spokesperson Award.
Beverly Martel 
Leadership, two-time president of Northern Lebanon Rotary Club.
Dorothy Perez
Performing arts, visual arts, and literary arts.
Tracie Seiders
State Auxiliary Hospital Representative to Lebanon Veterans Administration Hospital.
Cynthia Smith (Pennsylvania)
Agape Family Shelter and the Operation Santa program.
Linda Umberger (1941–2011)
Four decades as a registered nurse at Lebanon Veteran’s Administration Medical Center.

2014

Ann Marie Brewer
Community service, president of military Auxiliary Post 910 and Secretary of the Legion Riders Post 910.

Cynthia Bowman-Condor 
Registered nurse, chairperson for the Sexual Assault Response Team.

Carol Christ (Pennsylvania) – Community service, Treasurer and Board Member of the Lebanon County Historical Society.

Evelyn Colon (Pennsylvania)
Community service.

Deborah Freer
Trailblazer, Board of the Good Samaritan Hospital.

Judy Williams Henry
Dancer, actor and international choreographer.

Elaine Ludwig
Trailblazer, League of Women Voters, served on the Pennsyylvania committee for the National Voter Registration Act of 1993.

Kristy Ludwig
Health care.

Carol Maurer 
Co-founder of the Jack and Jill Preschool.

Diana Reilly
Community service.

Emily Simone
Health care.

Deb Tice
Substitute teacher, farm owner and volunteer 4-H leader.

Roberta Warshaw
Lebanon County Mediation Services.

2013

Holly Gonyea Dolan
Survivor of a medical stroke at age 27. Began blogging to help others negotiate the maze of health care insurance and claims.
Karen Dundore-Gullota 
Performing arts, literary arts, visual arts. 
Bridget Hofman 
Environmental Scientist and Industrial Hygienist.
Melissa Kulbitsky
Lebanon Valley Council on the Arts (LVCA).
Pat Krebs
Retired member of Pennsylvania House of Representatives, District 9, community organizer.
Sandra Meluskey
Trailblazer, career nurse, advocate of community involvement.
Rita Moore
Leadership in education, along with her husband organized Lebanon Area Adoptive Families.
Linda Siegel (4-H Extension Educator)
4-H Extension Educator for Penn State Extension in Lebanon County.
Megan Ryland Tanner
Attorney District Attorney’s Office, primarily prosecuting child abuse and sexual violence against women.
Jessica Tavara
Governor’s Advisory Commission on Latino Affairs, supporting community social growth.

2012

Julie Bergstresser
Coordinator the Veterans Justice Outreach Program.
Gina Bouchette
Registered dietitian promoting healthy lifestyles.
Yasmin Brown
Jewelry designer, owner of Spirit Dancer Designs.
Catherine Coyle
Trailblazer, Lebanon County’s first elected female District Justice in 1969.
Mary Dague
Leadership in education.
Roberta DeSantis
Environmentalist,  Greater Lebanon Refuse Authority.
Priscilla Walker Ebright
Service to military establishments and veterans. Member of Women’s Auxiliary of the Navy Club, USA Ship 91, American Legion Auxiliary and the American Legion Riders. Established a snack bar to help fund the Wounded Warrior Project.
Diana Hartman
Co-founder of Home Based Business Committee of the Lebanon Valley Chamber of Commerce. 2014 Business Person of the Year and 2007 Lester Leffler Memorial Community Volunteer Service Award for the Community of Lebanon Association.
Susan Klarsch (1955–2011)
 Emeritus Award, Executive Director of Lebanon County Commission on Drug and Alcohol Abuse.
Kathleen Moe "Kathy"
Community preservationist, co-author with Tanya Richter, of ordinance creating the Annville Township Historical Architectural Review Board (HARB) to preserve historic buildings.
Catherine Schott
Agriculture, President of the Lebanon County Society of Farm Women, Lebanon Area Fair’s Kitchen Manager.
Pamela Wildonger 
Promoting health care.

2011

Wanda Bechtold
Founded the Central Pennsylvania Supports the Troops in 2003.
Betty Ross Conner
(1930–2020) Ph.D in microbiology, and has focused her efforts for policies on land use, water quality and quantity. Pennsylvania League of Women Voters, co-founder of Swatara Creek Watershed Association.
Amy Mazella di Bosco
Lebanon County Recycling Coordinator.
Judy Feather
Board member of Family and Children Services in Lebanon County. Helped organize the League of Women Voters of Lebanon County.
Carol Hollich
Director of Music at Trinity United Methodist Church. Secretary of Lebanon County Community Concert Association. Owner of Hollich Studios in Palmyra.
Marilyn Nolte
Lebanon County Correctional Facility Women’s Chaplain.
Lorraine Royer
State Farm Women Society President. Member of Lebanon County Farm Women Society, and Lebanon Area Fair Queen Committee.
Carol Saltzer
Director of Crisis Intervention Services. Chair of the Lebanon Coalition to End Homelessness.
Redith Snoberger
(1942–2017) Community Trailblazer. Wernersville State Hospital Board of Trustee, president of Sexual Assault Resource Counseling Center.
Linda Summers (Pennsylvania)
Leadership in education.
Rose Walmer
Established the “Praise Dinner” program which helped raise $1,100,000 has been raised for religion-based public services.
Tina Washington
First African American teacher employed by the Lebanon School District.

2010

Ginger Beamesderfer
Plant Leader at AES Ironwood.

Lisa Brown (Pennsylvania)
Director of Curriculum and Instruction at Annville-Cleona High School.

Betty Eiceman
Lebanon’s first woman to serve as mayor.

Peggy J. Hengeveld
Brigadier General Ret. First woman of the Pennsylvania Army National Guard to graduate from the United States Army War College. 

Katherine Hoopes
President of the Lebanon Chapter of the Harmonia Music Club.

Ann Lasky
Successfully lobbied to convert a limestone quarry into the  Quittie Creek Nature Park.

Alleta Schadler
First female County Extension Office Director in Lebanon County

Mary Louise Sherk
(1925-2008) Education coordinator for Federal Head Start program.

Donna Williams (Pennsylvania)
Vice-President of Operations at Lebanon Valley Family Health Services.

Laurie Yurejefcic
Paralegal with MidPenn Legal Services of Lebanon, PA.

Sharon Zook
Revitalization of the South Sixth Street Playground.

References

External links

Official website

Women's halls of fame
Lists of American women
State halls of fame in the United States
History of women in Pennsylvania